The Breath of the Gods is a 1920 American silent romantic drama film directed by Rollin S. Sturgeon and starring Tsuru Aoki. Set during the Russo-Japanese War, the film is based on the 1905 novel of the same name by Sidney McCall.

No prints of The Breath of the Gods are known to exist, and it is now presumed to be a lost film.

Plot
As described in a film magazine, the Russo-Japanese War of 1904-1905 threatens the peace of Japan, so Yuki Onda (Aoki) is directed home from her American school by her father (Seki). With her sails a party of American diplomatic friends that includes Pierre Le Beau (Wheatcroft), to whom Yuki has pledged her love. Her father's faith in her inherited honor obliges her to marry Prince Hagane (Carewe), and in the opportunity to be of service to her country comes an opposing loyalty to him and love for Le Beau. Le Beau is an attache of the embassy of Australia in Japan, and he is made an unwilling instrument in an attempt to secure valuable information from her. Yuki, believing that she has failed in her trust, takes her own life, leaving a sorrowing Prince and the penitent and loving Le Beau.

Cast
 Tsuru Aoki as Yuki Onda
 Stanhope Wheatcroft as Pierre Le Beau
 Arthur Carewe as Prince Hagane
 Pat O'Malley as T. Caraway Dodge
 J. Barney Sherry as Senator Todd
 Marian Skinner as Mrs. Todd
 Ethel Shannon as Gwendolyn
 Misao Seki as Yuki's Father
 Mai Wells as Yuki's Mother
 Paul Weigel as Count Ronsard

References

External links

 
 
McCall, Sidney (1905), The Breath of the Gods, Boston: Little, Brown, and Company, on the Internet Archive

1920 drama films
1920 films
Silent American drama films
Silent romantic drama films
American romantic drama films
American silent feature films
American black-and-white films
Films based on American novels
Films set in Japan
Films set in Los Angeles
Films set in the 1900s
Lost American films
Russo-Japanese War
Universal Pictures films
Films directed by Rollin S. Sturgeon
1920 lost films
Lost drama films
Lost romance films
1920s American films